Acanthocephaloides is a genus of parasitic worms belonging to the family Arhythmacanthidae.

The species of this genus are found in Europe.

Species:

Acanthocephaloides claviformis 
Acanthocephaloides cyrusi 
Acanthocephaloides delamuri 
Acanthocephaloides distinctus 
Acanthocephaloides geneticus 
Acanthocephaloides ichiharai 
Acanthocephaloides irregularis 
Acanthocephaloides neobythitis 
Acanthocephaloides nicoli 
Acanthocephaloides plagiusae 
Acanthocephaloides propinquus 
Acanthocephaloides rhinoplagusiae 
Acanthocephaloides spinicaudatus

References

Echinorhynchida
Acanthocephala genera